Delicatessen is a term for fine food.

Delicatessen may also refer to:

Delicatessen (1991 film), a French black comedy film
Delicatessen (1930 film), a German romance film
Delicatessen (band), an English indie-rock group
Delikatessen (album), an album by the German band Oomph!

See also
Delicacy (film) or La délicatesse, a 2011 French romantic comedy-drama film